The 2018 ICC Women's World Twenty20 Qualifier was an international women's cricket tournament held from 7 to 14 July 2018 in the Netherlands. It was the third edition of the Women's World Twenty20 Qualifier and was the qualification tournament for the 2018 ICC Women's World Twenty20 tournament. The top two teams from the qualifier tournament progressed to the 2018 ICC Women's World Twenty20 in the West Indies.

In April 2018, the International Cricket Council (ICC) granted full international status to Twenty20 women's matches played between member sides from 1 July 2018 onwards. Therefore, all the matches in the qualifier tournament are played as Women's Twenty20 Internationals (WT20Is).

Ahead of the final round of group-stage matches, all eight teams still had a chance to qualify for the final of the tournament, and therefore secure a place in the 2018 ICC Women's World Twenty20. After the conclusion of the last group-stage matches, Bangladesh and Papua New Guinea from Group A, along with Ireland and Scotland from Group B, had all progressed to the semi finals. The other four teams, Netherlands, Thailand, Uganda and United Arab Emirates all progressed to the semi-final playoff matches, to determine their final ranking placements.

In the first semi final, Ireland beat Papua New Guinea by 27 runs, therefore advancing to the final of the tournament and qualifying for the 2018 ICC Women's World Twenty20 in the process. In the second semi final, Bangladesh beat Scotland by 49 runs, to also qualify for the tournament final and the 2018 ICC Women's World Twenty20. Bangladesh won the tournament, beating Ireland by 25 runs in the final. Ireland's Clare Shillington was named the player of the tournament.

Qualification
The following teams qualified for the tournament:

Squads
All the squads and match officials were confirmed by the ICC in June 2018.

Bangladesh also named Jannatul Ferdus, Lata Mondal, Murshida Khatun and Suraiya Azmin as players on standby for the series.

Fixtures
On 23 May 2018, the ICC confirmed all the fixtures for the qualifier tournament.

Group A

Group B

Semi-finals

Play-off matches

Final standings

 Qualified for the 2018 World Twenty20.

References

External links
 Tournament home at the ICC
 Series home at ESPN Cricinfo

International cricket competitions in 2018
Qualifier
International women's cricket competitions in the Netherlands
2018 in women's cricket
2018 in Dutch cricket
cricket